Arlo is a male given name, including a list of people and fictional characters with the name.

Arlo may refer to:
Arlo the Alligator Boy, a 2021 animated film
Arlo (album), by Arlo Guthrie, 1968
Arló, a village in Borsod-Abaúj-Zemplén county, Hungary
Arlo Technologies, an American company that makes wireless surveillance cameras

See also

Arno (disambiguation)